Wesselényi can refer to:

People with the surname
Ferenc Wesselényi (1605–1667), Hungarian military commander and palatine
Miklós Wesselényi

Other uses
Wesselényi conspiracy
Wesselényi Monument